Cynips quercusfolii is a gall wasp species in the genus Cynips. The species is important for the production of commercial nutgall formed on Quercus lusitanica (the gall oak).
Galls are located on the underside of leaves, with the majority of galls being on the second and third veins from the petiole of the leaf.

References

External links 

Cynipidae
Gall-inducing insects
Wasps described in 1758
Taxa named by Carl Linnaeus